HSC  Condor Liberation is a fast ferry that was built by Austal in Henderson, Western Australia. Previously named Austal Hull 270 and Condor 102, she entered service as HSC Condor Liberation with Channel Island ferry operator Condor Ferries on 27 March 2015.

History
Originally named Austal 102, she was launched in January 2010 at the Austal shipyard in Henderson, Western Australia and was laid up at the shipyard for four years before an owner was found. Rumours were that the ship was to enter service with Euroferries, operating a 75-minute service between Ramsgate in England and Boulogne-sur-Mer in France. She was due to be handed over to Euroferries in January 2013 and enter service in February 2013 but the service failed to materialise and the ship remained in Austal's hands.

Condor Liberation
In 2014, Condor Ferries extended its agreement to run Channel Island services until 2020 and subsequently negotiated the purchase of the Austal Hull 270, which it named Condor Liberation. After being modified at Austal’s Philippines yard, it entered service with Condor Ferries on 27 March 2015 operating out of Poole on the Dorset coast.

Collision in Guernsey
On Saturday 28 March 2015, the day after she entered official commercial service, Condor Liberation hit the quayside in Guernsey in strong winds. The collision caused damage to her hull which prevented further use of the vessel until repaired. She was taken out of service and was transferred to Poole where the damage was repaired. Passengers had to wait for Commodore Clipper to take them back to the UK, albeit to Portsmouth instead of Poole.

A report on the collision was published on 27 May 2015 and concluded that the fendering on the berth was insufficient for high speed craft and ruled out any wrongdoing of the ship's crew.

Issues in service
Condor Liberation has received numerous reports from passengers about the vessel's rolling characteristics. Notably an incident on 18 May 2015 prompted in excess of 50 reports of "Corkscrewing" in two metre seas on her evening sailing from Guernsey to Poole. This included a video filmed on board at the time of the incident clearly showing Condor Liberation listing heavily. Condor later reiterated the safety of the vessel noting the important difference between safety (and stability) and ride comfort.

Amid reports of ride problems and procedures for passenger embarkation (involving embarking via car decks for foot passengers), it was reported that the UK Maritime and Coastguard Agency would launch an investigation into the vessel's suitability to operate in the waters of the English Channel. It was later claimed by Condor that the MCA would not be launching an investigation, and would instead "follow up this matter with the flag state and the owners, to address the concerns being raised". In the end, the MCA investigated the vessel.

Condor has so far has remained mainly quiet on the issues surrounding Condor Liberation. The Guernsey External Transport Group requested a meeting with Condor to discuss the ongoing safety concerns and punctuality of the new vessel, which concluded with the Head of the Transport Group, Deputy Kevin Stewart, advising the public to "stop putting the boot in on Condor". Public outcry for this followed.

Guernsey's harbourmaster, noted as a former Condor Ferries employee by the local media, suggested in a media interview that members of the public "retrain their stomachs" for the vessel's ride. He later confirmed that his remark was taken out of context, and was, in fact, referring to the difference in riding behaviour between the older catamaran HSCs to which the public were accustomed and those of the new trimaran vessel.

Doug Bannister, Ports of Jersey chief executive, said they had been "inundated" with complaints about Condor, adding that they were currently reviewing parts of the operating agreement. He commented "What is important to make certain is that the travelling public in Jersey feel safe and it is a service that the Island wants".

References

Ships built by Austal
2009 ships
Ferries of the United Kingdom
Individual catamarans
High-speed craft